Lépine is a commune in the Pas-de-Calais department in the Hauts-de-France region of France.

Geography
Lépine is situated 6 miles (9 km) south of Montreuil-sur-Mer, just off the N1 on the D140 road.

Population

Places of interest
 The fifteenth century church of the Nativité-de-Notre-Dame.
 Château du Puits-Bérault, dating from the nineteenth century.

See also
 Communes of the Pas-de-Calais department

References

Communes of Pas-de-Calais